These are the official results of the men's 10,000 metres event at the 1983 IAAF World Championships in Helsinki, Finland. There were a total number of 37 participating athletes, with two qualifying heats held on Sunday 7 August and the final held on Tuesday 9 August 1983.

Records
Existing records at the start of the event.

Summary
With the best in the world filtered down to 18 finalists, there was still a traffic jam on the track.  In the first 80 metres several athletes were jostled trying to find running room.  Christoph Herle and Antonio Prieto found themselves lying on the track.  Out of the chaos, Bekele Debele was far back in the string of competitors, speeding down the outside of the backstretch.  This culminated with him taking over the lead for a short period of time before Gidamis Shahanga took over the point.  Joined by Mohamed Kedir, the three Africans jockeyed for the lead marked most closely by Carlos Lopes.  The African pace was not consistent, instead slowing until the field bunched then speeding up to disrupt the even pace most distance runners would prefer.  With 6 laps to go, tall, long striding, home favorite Martti Vainio took charge with a 63 second lap, exciting the crowd and forcing the field the change their pace to catch back up.  For three laps, Vainio held the lead but was looking for help that was not going to support him.  With three laps to go, the pack was bunched tighter than ever, 13 athletes all within 10 metres.  Again Kedir took the lead with Lopes almost attached to his shoulder.  50 metres before the bell, the pack was finally disrupted by Werner Schildhauer sprinting out to a 3 metre lead.  His East German teammate Hansjörg Kunze and Vaino rushed to cover the break.  Shahanga and Alberto Cova were the last to hang on to the breakaway down the final backstretch.  With 200 to go, Schildhauer had 3 metres on Kunze who had another 3 metres on Vainio, with Shahanga and Cova respectively another 2 and 4 metres back.  Through the final turn, all those distances began to compress.  By the time they hit the final straightaway, they were in the same order but with a metre separating each.  Each then pulled progressively wider, Cova all the way out to lane 4, so each could have running room for the sprint to the finish.  Cova was clearly the faster sprinter, cruising past the field.  Schildhauer and Kunze both leaned for the finish way too early, hoping the finish line would arrive sooner.  The first four runners separated by a third of a second after 10,000 metres.  The result was not exactly a surprise, it was the same result as the European Championships for Cova, Schildhauer, Vainio and 6th place Lopes, a year earlier, with the addition of Kunze and Shahanga.  Minus the boycotting East Germans, Cova pulled the same stunt on Vainio in what turned into a match race at the 1984 Olympics.  Days later, Vainio was later disqualified for doping.

Results

Heats 
The qualifying heats took place on 7 August, with the 37 athletes involved being splitted into 2 heats. The first 5 athletes in each heat ( Q ) and the next 8 fastest ( q ) qualified for the final.

Final 
The final took place on August 9.

References
 Results

10,000 metres at the World Athletics Championships
Events at the 1983 World Championships in Athletics